Many major earthquakes have occurred in the region of the Kamchatka Peninsula in far eastern Russia. Events in 1737, 1923 and 1952, were megathrust earthquakes and caused tsunamis. There are many more earthquakes and tsunamis originating from the region.

Tectonic setting
The southern part of the Kamchatka peninsula lies above the convergent plate margin where the Pacific Plate is subducting beneath the Okhotsk Plate along the line of the Kuril–Kamchatka Trench. The rate of convergence between the two plates is about 86 mm per year. Earthquakes are generated by rupture along the megathrust boundary between the two plates, within the descending Pacific Plate and within the overriding Okhotsk Plate. The northern part of the peninsula lies away from the convergent boundaries of the Kuril–Kamchatka Trench and the Aleutian Trench but across the boundary between two blocks within the North American Plate, the Kolyma-Chukotka and Bering Sea microplates. This boundary accommodates both active shortening and right lateral strike-slip across a series of large SW–NE trending faults.

1737 earthquake

This earthquake occurred at a depth of 40 km (25 miles). A magnitude of 8.3 Ms (9.0Mw) has been estimated.

1841 earthquake

An earthquake of estimated magnitude 9.0 , with an epicenter just offshore, which triggered a large tsunami.

1923 earthquakes

On February 3, 1923, an estimated magnitude 8.3–8.5 Mw earthquake with an approximate location of  triggered a 25-foot tsunami that caused considerable damage in Kamchatka, with a reported 3 deaths. The tsunami was still 6 meters (20 feet) high when it reached Hawaii, causing at least one fatality. There was another earthquake and tsunami in April 1923, which caused locally high tsunami runup near Ust' Kamchatsk, leaving a deposit studied by Minoura and others.

1952 earthquake

The main earthquake struck at 16:58 GMT (04:58 local time) on November 4, 1952. Initially assigned a magnitude of 8.2, the quake was revised to 9.0 Mw in later years. A large tsunami resulted, causing destruction and loss of life around the Kamchatka peninsula and the Kuril Islands. Hawaii was also struck, with estimated damage of up to US$1 million and livestock losses, but no human casualties were recorded. Japan reported no casualties or damage. The tsunami reached as far as Alaska, Chile, and New Zealand.

The length of the subduction zone rupture was 600 km (373 miles). Aftershocks were recorded in an area of approximately 247,000 km2 (90,367 square miles), at depths of between 40 and 60 km (25 and 37 miles). A recent analysis of the tsunami runup distribution based on historical and geological records give some indication as to the slip distribution of the rupture.

1959 earthquake

A magnitude  8.0 earthquake occurred on May 4, at a hypocentral depth  of 20 km, with a maximum felt intensity of VIII MSK.

2006 earthquake

The region of Koryak Autonomous Okrug was struck by an  7.6 earthquake on April 20 (April 21 local time). It was followed by a large number of aftershocks, including two of  6.6. This was a reverse faulting event along the boundary between two microplates within the North American Plate. The event caused a 140 km long zone of surface rupture.

2020 earthquake

The  7.5 earthquake occurred on March 25. The earthquake was the largest to occur in Russia since the 2013 Okhotsk Sea earthquake. It was initially reported as 7.8 , before being downgraded to 7.5.

This shock was a result of near-trench intraplate compressional faulting within the descending Pacific Plate. The epicenter was in the area of the large-slip region of the 1952 Severo-Kurilsk earthquake, which was an M 9.0 megathrust event.  Large compressional activity is more common before, and long after, major compressional events along coupled zones, suggesting interplate strain accumulation. 

In Petropavlovsk-Kamchatsky, 285 miles (460km) away from the epicenter the intensity was felt at 5, objects were falling in buildings and people ran out into the street for safety.

A tsunami warning was issued immediately after the earthquake. The Pacific Tsunami Warning Centre initially said hazardous tsunami waves were possible within 1,000km of the earthquake’s epicentre. It said earthquakes of this strength in the past had caused tsunamis far from the epicentre. A tsunami of about  struck Kamchatka.

See also

References

External links
 Землетрясения на Командорских островах.
 Землетрясения на Камчатке: информация, впечатления жетелей Камчатки.

Kamchatka Peninsula
2020 earthquakes
2020 tsunamis
Earthquakes in the Russian Far East
2020 disasters in Russia